Charles John de Lacy (1856 – 13 December 1929) was one of the foremost British marine artists of his period. He was especially known for his warship imagery and was regularly commissioned by Elswick, Tyne and Wear shipbuilder W. G. Armstrong Whitworth.

Life
Son of Robert de Lacy, a professor of music, and his wife Eliza, Charles de Lacy was born in 1856 in Sunderland, County Durham, and grew up in the Bishopwearmouth area of the city. Although he would do much work in that area, by 1870 his family had relocated from the North East of England to Lambeth in London. While in Lambeth he married Alice Harriet Hill in 1880 and they had two daughters, Constance Rosamond De Lacy (b. 1881) and Irene Valerie Cristoforo De Lacy (b. 1901). In the matter of his death 1936 is often cited; however, the evidence suggests 1929 is correct. He died in Epsom, Surrey.

He first exhibited at the Royal Academy in 1889, having undertaken training at The National Gallery. Magazines such as The Illustrated London News were among early patrons.

Sources vary regarding the correct spelling of the surname: "de Lacy" or "de Lacey". Three of the cited sources say "de Lacy" (including Art UK). The Royal Museums at Greenwich (including the National Maritime Museum) use both forms.
In the 1911 census entry in his own hand is written Charles John De Lacy and he says of himself "Artist, Painter and Press artist".

Individual notable works

The Battle Against the Spanish Armada
The Kinfauns Castle as a Troopship (National Maritime Museum)
HMS Vindictive Storming Zeebrugge Mole (during the Zeebrugge Raid) which hangs in the Britannia Royal Naval College.
The Sinking of the Lusitania
"The Funeral of queen Victoria" Porthmouth  1st  February 1901

Much of his work was done as book illustration or as commercial art for shipbuilders. Amongst major publishing names who used his material were Frederick Warne & Co, Thomas Nelson, Cassell, Methuen Publishing and S.P.C.K.

Selected public collections holding de Lacy material
The National Maritime Museum
Tyne & Wear Archives & Museums
Archive item 450/1
Brazilean scout (2 images)
HMS Invincible (2 images)
Brazilian battleship Minas Geraes (2 images)
Argentine gunboat Parana
Argentine armoured gunboat Rosario
HMS Superb (3 images)
Archive item 696/7/15
Elswick 1911
Chao Ho
Russell-Cotes Art Gallery & Museum
Cowes Maritime Museum

Further reading

 – two images from Tyne & Wear Archives & Museums item 679/7/15: Elswick 1911 (cover) and Chao Ho (page 37)

Notes

References

1856 births
1929 deaths
19th-century English painters
English male painters
20th-century English painters
British marine artists
British war artists
City of Sunderland
Charles
19th-century English male artists
20th-century English male artists